Geert-Maarten Christiaan Mol (born October 12, 1983) is a Dutch One Day International cricketer. His brother Hendrik-Jan Mol also plays for the Netherlands cricket team.

Career
Mol made his ODI debut in a game against Ireland at Belfast. Batting at number 8, he came to the crease in the 47th over with his side edging towards an upset. With 6 runs required from  the final 3 deliveries of the match, Mol was on strike and facing Kevin O'Brien. He played out a couple of dots balls, the first allowed to go through to the keeper. Needing a six to win off the last ball he could only manage a 4 through the covers meaning that the Netherlands lost by one run.

Notes

External links

1983 births
Living people
Dutch cricketers
Netherlands One Day International cricketers
Netherlands Twenty20 International cricketers
Sportspeople from The Hague